The  were three Super Robot anime series created by "Saburo Yatsude" (a collective name for the staff at Toei), directed by Tadao Nagahama, and aired on TV Asahi and its affiliates from late 1976 through early 1979. The trilogy, consisting of Chōdenji Robo Combattler V, Chōdenji Machine Voltes V, and Tōshō Daimos, was a co-production between Tohokushinsha Film, Nippon Sunrise (formerly Soeisha) and Toei Company with Nippon Sunrise providing the animation work on Toei's behalf. The series are notable for developing ideas from Brave Raideen, helping the super robot genre evolve from a series meant mainly to sell toys with little to no plot or character development from episode to episode, into a series capable of telling dramatic stories of human conflict and compassion.

References

Super robot anime and manga
Bandai Namco franchises
Trilogies